Ahmed El-Nahass (born in 1950) is an Egyptian movie director.

El-Nahass worked for many year with the biggest names in the Egyptian cinema field, like Kamal El Sheikh and Al-Zurkani. His first movie was The Lost Plane, which won an award at Alexandria's movie festival.

References

External links

 Filmography

1950 births
Living people
Egyptian film directors